The Bennington Battlefield is the Rensselaer County, New York, location where the Battle of Bennington occurred on the 16th of August 1777.  It is located on New York State Route 67 in Walloomsac, New York, a historic route between Bennington, Vermont and the Hudson River.  Here, New Hampshire, Vermont and Massachusetts militia under General John Stark rebuffed a British attempt led by Colonel Friedrich Baum to capture American stores.  It was declared a National Historic Landmark in 1961.  A portion of the battlefield is preserved in the Bennington Battlefield State Historic Site.

Description

The river valley is flanked by a series of hills with steeply ridged sides. The state historic site encompasses the top of one of these hills as well as some of its surrounding terrain; it is at this site that some of the most concentrated fighting took place. The modern Route 67 no longer exactly follows the alignment of the road in 1777, but a bridge crossing on a nearby secondary street is believed to be located near a key crossing site at the time. Most of the hillside terrain is now wooded, while portions of the river floodplain are in agricultural use (as they were in 1777), and the hilltop of the state historic site has been cleared. A 19th-century railroad right-of-way, also following the river, is a significant intrusion on the battlefield landscape.

Prior to the Battle of Bennington, British troops (mainly Hessians) under the command of Colonel Baum occupied this particular hilltop, with additional detachments guarding the bridge, the ridge on the south side of the river, and a stream crossing north of the river and east of the hill.  The American troops led by General Stark were able to reconnoiter these positions and sneak up on them, executing a surprise attack.  Baum's forces were eventually routed, and he was slain.  Hessian reinforcements arrived near the end of the first phase of the battle, and were eventually also put to chase, with the battlefield extending as far as a mile further down the river valley.  The battle was a serious blow to the campaign of British General John Burgoyne depriving him of a needed supplies and a significant portion of his army as he made his push toward Albany, New York. and set the stage for his subsequent surrender at Saratoga.

See also

 List of New York State Historic Sites
 List of National Historic Landmarks in New York
 Bennington Monument, which also commemorates the battle

References

External links

Bennington Battlefield State Historic Site at NYS OPRHP
The Battle of Bennington: An American Victory, a National Park Service Teaching with Historic Places (TwHP) lesson plan

New York (state) historic sites
American Revolutionary War sites
National Register of Historic Places in Rensselaer County, New York
Parks in Rensselaer County, New York
National Historic Landmarks in New York (state)